Kerabari may refer to:

Kerabari, Gandaki, Nepal
Kerabari, Kosi, Nepal
Kerabari Gaupalika, Nepal